Richard Bate (25 June 1946 – 25 April 2018) was an English football player and coach.

As a coach, he was the head of the youth Academy for Cardiff City, before leaving in 2015. Prior to that he was the Elite Coaching Manager of the Football Association, the governing body for football in England.

Playing career
Wilkinson moved to Mossley in December 1976 as player-manager and when he resigned the following May he recommended Bate as his successor and Bate was duly appointed player-manager in June 1977. However, despite steering Mossley into the first round of the FA Cup for only the (then) third time in their history, he departed the club following a 2–2 draw with Frickley Athletic on 2 January 1978.

Coaching career

Southend United
In June 1987, Bate was appointed manager of Southend United by the club's chairman Vic Jobson without consulting his fellow board members. He reign lasted just ten games with a solitary victory in the Football League Cup and he departed with the worst record of any Southend manager in history.

Bate moved on to join Lincoln City as assistant manager to Colin Murphy, helping the club regain its Football League status at the end of the 1987–88 season. He moved on to rejoin Wilkinson at Leeds United acting as a coach between 1988 and 1992. He moved to Malaysia as Technical Director, a role he held from 1992 to 1995, before joining the coaching staff of Hereford United. In 1998, he became the coach of the England youth set-up working with the U16, U17, U18, U19 and U20 teams. He was caretaker manager of the England women's national football team for a match against Italy in April 1998; between the resignation of Ted Copeland and appointment of Hope Powell.

Canada
In September 2005, the appointment of Bate as the Canadian Soccer Association's Technical Director was announced with the role commencing on 14 October 2005. He held the role for ten months before resigning in order to join Watford.

Watford
In July 2006, Bate was appointed Technical Director at Watford with the Hornet's then manager Aidy Boothroyd being quoted as saying "I want Watford Football Club to have the best Academy in the world and I believe we have captured the best developer of talent in the world in the shape of Richard."

Cardiff City

On 2 November 2012, it was confirmed that Bate was to take on the role of the Head of the youth Academy for Cardiff City, replacing the departing Neal Ardley.

Life after coaching
Before the time of his death in April 2018, Bate worked with Burnley on a consultancy basis during the clubs redevelopment of the Barnfield Training Centre.

References

1946 births
2018 deaths
Southend United F.C. managers
Boston United F.C. players
Buxton F.C. players
Mossley A.F.C. players
Mossley A.F.C. managers
Watford F.C. non-playing staff
Cardiff City F.C. non-playing staff
Lincoln City F.C. non-playing staff
England women's national football team managers
Malaysia national football team managers
English footballers
English football managers
English expatriate football managers
British expatriates in Malaysia
Expatriate football managers in Malaysia
English expatriate sportspeople in Canada
Expatriate soccer managers in Canada
Association footballers not categorized by position